Mattias Andersson may refer to:

Mattias Andersson (racing driver) (born 1973), Swedish race car driver
Mattias Andersson (handballer) (born 1978), Swedish handball player, silver medalist at the 2012 Summer Olympics
Mattias Andersson (footballer, born 1981), Swedish football striker
Mattias Andersson (footballer, born 1998), Swedish football defender